Quintuple meter or quintuple time is a musical meter characterized by five beats in a measure.

They may consist of any combination of variably stressed or equally stressed beats.

Like the more common duple, triple, and quadruple meters, it may be simple, with each beat divided in half, or compound, with each beat divided into thirds.

Notation

Another notational variant involves compound meters, in which two or three numerals take the place of the expected numerator. It may, for example, indicate a bar of triple meter in which each beat is subdivided into five parts. In this case, the meter is sometimes characterized as "triple quintuple time".

It is also possible for a  time signature to be used for an irregular, or additive, metrical pattern, such as groupings of  eighth notes or, for example in the Hymn to the Sun and Hymn to Nemesis by Mesomedes of Crete, which may alternatively be given the composite signature .

History

Before the 20th century, quintuple time was rare in European concert music, but is more commonly found in other cultures.

Ancient Greek music
Rhythm in ancient Greek music was closely tied to poetic meter, and included what are understood today as quintuple patterns. The two Delphic Hymns from the second century BC both provide examples. The First Delphic Hymn, by Athenaeus, son of Athenaeus, is in the quintuple Cretic meter throughout. The first nine of the ten sections of the Second Hymn, by Limenius, are also in Cretic meter.

In addition to the Cretic meter, which consisted of a long-short-long pattern, ancient Greek music had seven other quintuple meters: Bacchic (L-L-S), Palimbacchic (or antibacchic: S-L-L), four species of Paeanic (L-S-S-S, S-L-S-S, S-S-L-S—which is a composite of pyrrhic and trochee—and S-S-S-L), and hyporchematic (S-S-S-S-S).

Asia, Transcaucasia, and the Middle East
Arabic theorists already in the early Abbasid period (AD 750–900) described modal rhythmic cycles (īqā‘āt), that included quintuple meters, though taxonomies and terminology vary amongst writers. The first figure to describe these rhythms was Abū Yūsuf Ya‘qūb al-Kindī (ca 801–ca 866), who divided them into two broad categories, ṯẖaqīl ("heavy", meaning slow) and khafīf ("light", meaning quick). Two of his ṯẖaqīl modes—ṯẖaqīl thānī ("second heavy", S-S-L-S) and ramal (L-S-L)—and one khafīf mode are quintuple. The most important writers of the later Abbasid period (AD 900–1258) were Abū Naṣr al-Fārābī (d. 950) and Ibn Sīnā (d. 1037). Al-Fārābī elaborated the rhythmic system established a century earlier by another important early Abbasid musician, Isḥāq al-Mawṣilī, who had based it on local traditions, without any knowledge of classical Greek music theory. Isḥāq's and al-Fārābī's system consisted of eight rhythmic modes, the third and fourth of which were quintuple: called ṯẖaqīl thānī ("second heavy"), and khafīf al-ṯẖaqīl thānī ("second light heavy"), both of which are short-short-short-long, in slow and fast tempo, respectively. This terminology and these definitions continued to be found as late as the 12th century in Muslim Spain, for example in a document by Abd-Allāh ibn Muḥammad ib al-Ṣīd al-Baṭaliawsī.

Turkish classical music employs a system of rhythmic modes (called usul), which include units ranging from two to ten time units. The five-beat meter is called türk aksağı.

The traditional music of Adjara in Western Georgia includes an ancient war-dance called Khorumi, which is in quintuple meter.

The cyclically repeating fixed time cycles of Carnatic and Hindustani classical music, called tālas, include both fast and slow quintuple patterns, as well as binary, ternary, and septenary cycles. In the Carnatic system, there is a complex "formal" system of tālas which is of great antiquity, and a more recent, rather simpler "informal" system, comprising selected tālas from the "formal" system, plus two fast tālas called Cāpu. The slow quintuple tāla, called Jhampā is from the formal system, and consists of a pattern of  beats; the fast quintuple tāla is called khaṇḍa Cāpu or ara Jhampā, and consists of  beats. However, the pattern of beats marking the rotation of the cycle does not necessarily indicate the internal rhythmic organization.

The tālas in Hindustani music are somewhat more complicated. To begin with, they are not systematically codified, but rather comprise a miscellany of patterns from a number of different repertories. Third, in addition to the sounded vibhāg, marked by hand-claps (tālī), there are also vibhāg marked only by a wave of the hand—the so-called khālī beats. The two quintuple tālas in these repertories are Jhaptāl——and Sūltāl—. Both are measured by ten mātrā units, but Jhaptāl is divided into four unequal vibhāg (the third being a khālī beat) in two halves of five mātrā each, and Sūltāl is divided into five equal vibhāg, the second and fifth of which are khālī.

The kasa repertory of traditional Korean court music often employs cycles in quintuple time, even though Korean traditional music terminology has no specific term for it. This repertory can be traced back in some cases to the fifteenth century. Quintuple meter is also occasionally found in folk music, with perhaps the most well-known example being the Eotmori (엇모리) rhythm (장단) often employed in Sanjo. Quintuple is the oldest surviving traditional Korean meter.

Australia
Quintuple meter occurs as a variation in some women's dance songs of indigenous Australians, where a  measure is occasionally inserted into songs with a basic duple or four-beat pattern.

The Americas
Traditional dance songs of the Yupik of Alaska are accompanied by frame drums, beaten with a long thin wand, most commonly in a  crotchet–dotted crotchet (quarter–dotted quarter) pattern.

European folk music
Many European folk and traditional repertories also feature quintuple meter. This is particularly true of Slavic cultural groups. The Bulgarian "paidushko" dance, for example, is in a fast , counted . In north-eastern Poland (especially in Kurpie, Masuria, and northern Podlaskie), five-beat bars are frequently found in wedding songs, with rather slow tempos and not accompanied by dancing. Traditional Russian wedding songs also are in quintuple time. The Poles and Russians share this proclivity for quintuple meter with the Finns, Sames (Lapps), Estonians, and Latvians. In Finland, the Kalevalaic "runometric" songs are the most distinctive feature of folk music, and the most common melody of these epic songs is in quintuple meter. This melody was described in the oldest study of runo singing in 1766, but first published in a musical transcription only about 20 years later. One South Slavic example is recorded in a manual published in 1714 by the Venetian dancing master Gregorio Lambranzi. It is a forlana titled "Polesana", probably meaning "From Pola", a city in Istria—today a part of Croatia but a Venetian possession until 1947.

Greek folk music is also characterized by rhythms in asymmetrical meters. The repertory of the Peloponnese, for example, includes the Doric tsakonikos from Doric-speaking (see Tsakonian language) Kynouria in  time. The Epirus region of Northern Greece also has dance melodies in a slow 5 (2–3).

Spanish folk music is also noted for the use of quintuple meter, particularly well-known examples being the Castilian rueda and the Basque zortziko, but it is also found in the music of Extremadura, Aragon, Valencia, and Catalonia. In the Alsatian region of Kochersberg, a peasant dance called the Kochersberger Tanz is in  time, and is similar to a dance of the Upper Palatinate in Bavaria called Der Zwiefache or Gerad und Ungerad, because it alternates even and uneven bars ( and ).

European art music

Medieval and Renaissance
In European art music it became possible only in the 14th century to notate quintuple rhythms unambiguously, through the use of minor or reversed coloration. In some instances from the late-14th-century Ars subtilior period, quintuple passages occur which are long enough to regard as an established meter. The earliest complete European compositions in quintuple time, however, appear to be seven villancicos in the Cancionero Musical de Palacio, which were composed between 1516 and 1520. Notation of the quintuple meter in these seven pieces is achieved in various ways:

 Juan de Anchieta uses  (tempus perfectum, proportio quintupla), in both "Con amores, mi madre" (1465), and "Dos ánades, madre".
 The anonymous "Pensad ora'n al" uses the mensuration .
 "Las mis penas madre" by Pedro de Escobar and "De ser mal casada" by Diego Fernández (d. 1551) both use just the proportion sign .
Other examples from the 16th century include the In Nomine "Trust" by Christopher Tye, the "Qui tollis" section of Jacob Obrecht's Missa "Je ne demande", the "Sanctus" from the Missa Paschalis by Heinrich Isaac, and the final "Agnus Dei" of Antoine Brumel's Missa "Bon temps". Keyboard examples from this period include the first half of an English setting of the offertory Felix namque from about 1530, and a passage in no. 41 of the Libro de tientos (1626) by Francisco Correa de Arauxo.

Baroque and Classical
In the Baroque and Classical eras quintuple meter is, if anything, even less frequently encountered than in the Renaissance. One possible example is the ritornello that precedes and follows Orfeo's aria "Vi ricorda" in act 2 of Claudio Monteverdi's L'Orfeo. The notation is problematic, however, and while several editors (Robert Eitner, Vincent d'Indy, Hugo Leichtentritt, and Carl Orff) have transcribed it in quintuple meter, others interpret it differently. Johann Heinrich Schmelzer included a  section of 27 measures in his Harmonia à 5, composed by at least 1668. Two brief passages of  occur in the "mad scene" (act 2, scene 11) from Handel's opera Orlando (1732), first at the words "Già solco l'onde" ("Already I am cleaving the waves") when the demented hero believes he has embarked on Charon's boat on the Styx, and then again two bars later. Burney's German contemporary, Johann Kirnberger, also felt that "No one can repeat groups of five and even less of seven equal pulses in succession without wearisome strain".

This freedom from the ordinary alternation of two and three is well expressed by the grouping of the accompaniment, which varies throughout the movement…".

19th century
There appear to have been several motivations for composers to use quintuple time: firstly to demonstrate technical skill, as in the Tye and Correa de Arauxo examples, and secondly to produce an atmospheric effect, or to suggest unease or unusual excitement, as in Handel's Orlando. In the 19th century, a third motivation arises with the rise of nationalistic music, which often invokes folk-music elements. In any case, quintuple time becomes much more frequent (though still not common) in the 19th century. Early examples include Fugue 20 (Allegretto) from Anton Reicha's Trente-six fugues for piano (1805), the tenor aria "Viens, gentille dame" from act 2 of François-Adrien Boieldieu's opera La dame blanche (1825), and the third movement (Larghetto, con molta espressione), from Frédéric Chopin's Piano Sonata No. 1 in C minor, Op. 4 (1828). Although Reicha's fugue probably falls into the category of technical skill, the composer does mention taking as a model for the meter the Alsatian Kochersberger Tanz.

Nationalistic influence is clearer in the operas of the Russian composer Mikhail Glinka: the "Nuptial chorus and scene" from act 3 of the opera A Life for the Tsar (1834–1836) was the first time a composer of art music set the pentasyllabic hemistichs of Russian wedding songs in quintuple meter instead of adapting it to a more conventional one. In his next opera, Ruslan and Ludmila (1837–1842) Glinka repeated the effect in the opening of act 1, where the chorus sings an epithalamium to Lel', the Slavonic god of love, once again in quintuple time.

The central trio section, b. 235–313 is in  time.

From around the middle of the century, there is Carl Loewe's ballad for voice and piano, "Prinz Eugen, der edle Ritter", Op. 92 (to the poem by Ferdinand Freiligrath, 1844), which is in  time throughout, Ferdinand Hiller's Piano Trio No. 4, Op. 64 (1855) and Rhythmische Studien for piano, a String Trio by K. J. Bischoff, which was awarded a prize by the Deutsche Tonhalle in 1853, and Benjamin Godard's Violin Sonata No. 4, Op. 12 (1872) which includes a scherzo in  time throughout. The piano virtuoso Charles-Valentin Alkan showed an interest in unusual rhythmic devices, and composed at least four keyboard pieces in quintuple time: the first three of the Deuxième recueil d'impromptus, Op. 32, no. 2 (1849), Andantino, Allegretto, and Vivace (the fourth and last piece in this collection is in septuple meter), and a  "Zorzico dance" episode in the Petit Caprice, réconciliation, Op. 42 (1857). In opera, Wagner, inserted several  bars in "Tristan, der Held, in jubelnder Kraft", in act 3 of Tristan und Isolde (1856–1859). Another instance from around this same time is found in Anton Rubinstein's "sacred opera" Der Thurm zu Babel (The Tower of Babel), Op. 80 (1868–1869). At the very end of the century, Alban Berg used  meter throughout his song-setting of Theodor Storm's poem, "Schließe mir die Augen beide" (1900).

Three of the best-known examples of quintuple meter in the symphonic repertoire are from late in the neoromantic (or post-romantic) period, which reaches from the mid-19th century through World War I: the second movement of Tchaikovsky's Symphony No. 6 in B minor, "Pathétique", Op. 74 (1893) (described by one author as the very first example of quintuple meter in Western classical music), Rachmaninoff's The Isle of the Dead, Op. 29 (1908), and the opening movement, "Mars, the Bringer of War" of The Planets (1914–1916) by Gustav Holst. (The final movement, "Neptune, the Mystic", is also in quintuple meter, but this is less well known.) The first theme of Tchaikovsky's Symphony No. 6, mvmt. II is shown below.

The Finnish composer Jean Sibelius used a pattern of quintuple meter in the third movement of Kullervo (1891–1892), where "the orchestra maintains a pattern of five beats in a bar, while the chorus elongates its lines to phrases of fifteen, ten, eight, and twelve beats, respectively". These are Karelian rhythms, reflecting nationalism in Sibelius's music. He used these quintuple meters as well in several male-chorus works: "Venematka" (no. 3 from Six Partsongs, Op. 18, 1893), the third movement, "Hyvää iltaa, lintuseni", from Rakastava, Op. 14 (1894), and "Sortunut ääni" (no. 1 from Six Partsongs, Op. 18, 1898).

In 1895, the British composer Samuel Coleridge-Taylor wrote the second movement, "Serenade", of his Fantasiestücke, Op. 5, for string quartet in  time. A little more than ten years later, the Scottish composer Robert Ernest Bryson wrote a string-orchestra fantasy titled Vaila in  time.

  alternates regularly with  throughout (effectively )

The opening measures are shown below:

To this same period (and to the Russian tradition) also belongs "Prizrak" (Phantom), in  time, which is No. 4 of Sergei Prokofiev's Four Pieces for Piano, Op. 3 (1911).

These examples are all simple quintuple time. "Fêtes", the second movement of Claude Debussy's Nocturnes for orchestra (1892–1899), also has a recurring passage of two  bars, embedded in a context of mainly compound triple bars. The first section of Nikolai Medtner's Piano Sonata Op. 25 No. 2 in E minor ("Night Wind"), which is from 1911, is "perhaps the most extended piece of music in  time in existence".

20th century
The common occurrence of quintuple meter in many folk-music traditions caused an increase in its appearance in the works of composers with nationalistic tendencies in the early 20th century. Examples are the Prelude in the Unison from George Enescu's Orchestral Suite No. 1, Op. 9 (1903), "In Mixolydian Mode", "Bulgarian Rhythm (2)", and the third of "Six Dances in Bulgarian Rhythm", nos. 48, 115, and 150 from Béla Bartók's Mikrokosmos (1926, 1932–1939), the "Chanson épique", no. 2 from Maurice Ravel's song cycle Don Quichotte à Dulcinée (1932–1933), and the first theme group of Carlos Chávez's Sinfonía india (1935–1936), which is predominantly in  time, but mixed with other meters. Another impulse for the use of quintuple meter was to evoke pagan and specifically Ancient Greek culture. The  meter of the bacchanalian "Danse générale" concluding Ravel's ballet Daphnis et Chloé (1909–1912) is a particularly well-known example. In his First Symphony, the Sinfonía de Antígona (1933), Carlos Chávez reworked incidental music he had composed in 1932 for a production of Sophocles' Antigone in the adaptation by Jean Cocteau. In this symphony Chávez made extensive use of the Greek paeonic (or cretic) meter, notated in  time in the score.

A fourth example from Ravel is a particularly intense, if brief use of quintuples for symbolic purposes. This is Frontispice for two pianos (1918), written at the request of Ricciotto Canudo to accompany a philosophical meditation on World War I, titled S.P. 503, le poème du Vardar. Canudo's title bears the numerical designation of the postal sector of his combat division, and Ravel used the numbers as the basis of his composition.

The Basque setting of Pierre Loti's play Ramuntcho made the inclusion of Basque traditional melodies in the incidental music composed for it in 1907 by Gabriel Pierné a natural choice. Pierné included at the end of act 2 an arrangement of the Basque anthem Gernikako Arbola by José María Iparraguirre, which is in zortziko rhythm, but he also quotes traditional zortziko melodies, as well as imitating their quintuple rhythms, in the opening "Ouverture sur des thèmes populaires basques" as well as in the "Rapsodie basque" that serves as an interlude between the first and second tableaux of act 2. Pierné, who was attracted to quintuple meter as part of a broader taste for exoticism, also employed quintuple meter in his Piano Quintet, Op. 41 (1917), and in the Fantaisie basque, Op. 49 (1927), for violin and orchestra. The outer sections of the second movement of the Quintet are in  time, and marked "Sur une rythme de Zortzico", while the contrasting central section superimposes  on  time, in "quadruple quintuple" meter. In the Fantaisie, a long section near the beginning is in  time, and is marked "Rythme de Zortzico".

Igor Stravinsky's name is often associated with rhythmic innovation in the 20th century, and quintuple meter is sometimes found in his music—for example, the fugato variation in the second movement of his Octet (1922–1923) is written almost uniformly in  time. Much more characteristically, however, quintuple bars in Stravinsky's scores are found in a context of constantly changing meters, as for example in his ballet The Rite of Spring (1911–1913), where the object appears to be the combination of two- and three-note subdivisions in irregular groupings.

This treatment of rhythm subsequently became so habitual for Stravinsky that, when he composed his Symphony in C in 1938–1940, he found it worth observing that the first movement had no changes of meter at all (though the metrical irregularities in the third movement of the same work were amongst the most extreme in his entire output).

So many other composers followed Stravinsky's example in the use of irregular meters that the occasional occurrence of quintuple-time bars becomes unremarkable from the 1920s onward. Entire movements with a constant five-to-a-bar rhythm are less-often encountered. An example is the second-movement "Lament" of the Double Concerto for Two Violins and Orchestra, Op. 49 (1929), by Gustav Holst. One particularly notable pre–World War II quintuple-meter composition is the popular first movement, "Aria (Cantilena)" (1938), of the Bachianas Brasileiras no. 5 by Heitor Villa-Lobos (the second movement was added only in 1945).

The Passacaglia for piano (1943) by Walter Piston is in quintuple meter.

In the post-war period, Gian Carlo Menotti used a quintuple-meter funeral march as an instrumental transition to the final scene of his opera The Consul (1950), and Britten set "Green Leaves Are We, Red Rose Our Golden Queen", the opening chorus from his opera Gloriana, Op. 53 (1952–1953, rev. 1966), in  time. Dmitri Shostakovich set Fugues 12, 17, and 19 from his Twenty-Four Preludes and Fugues for piano, Op. 87 (1950–1951) entirely in  time, and also interspersed this time signature with other meters in Preludes 9, 20, and 24, and in Fugues 15 and 16 from the same collection. Fugue No 17 in A major follows in the Slavic tradition of "naturally" flowing music in five time.

Quintuple meter is sometimes employed to characterize particular variations of works in variation form. Examples include the third movement, "Variations on a Ground", from the Double Concerto for Two Violins and Orchestra, Op. 49 (1929), by Gustav Holst (11th and 18th variations in ), "Variation IV: Più mosso" (in  time), in Part I of The Age of Anxiety: Symphony No. 2 (1949) by Leonard Bernstein. In a similar fashion, extended single-movement compositions may set off large sections by using contrasting meters.

In the minimal music that emerged in the late 1960s, quintuple meter is not often encountered. A rare exception is found in an early work by Steve Reich, Reed Phase (1966), which is built on the constant repetition of a five-note basic unit in steady quavers.

Reich was not satisfied with the result, largely because of the failure of the meter to produce the kind of rhythmic ambiguity found in the 12-beat patterns he came to favour:

{{Quote|which can divide up in very different ways; and that ambiguity as to whether you're in duple or triple time is, in fact, the rhythmic life-blood of much of my music. In this way, one's listening mind can shift back and forth within the musical fabric, because the fabric encourages that. But if you dont build in that flexibility of perspective, then you wind up with something extremely flat-footed and boring.}}
Reich's 1979 Octet (originally scored for two pianos, string quartet, and two wind players who perform on both flutes and clarinets), revised and rescored as Eight Lines) is entirely in quintuple time.

Jazz and popular music

A survey of American popular music found that the most common accent pattern used in quintuple meter is strong-weak-weak-medium-weak.

 Musical theatre 
Until after the Second World War, quintuple time was virtually unheard of in the American genres of jazz and popular music. When in 1944, Stravinsky was commissioned by Billy Rose to compose a fifteen-minute dance component to be incorporated into his Broadway revue, The Seven Lively Arts, Stravinsky composed Scènes de ballet, to be choreographed by Anton Dolin. Rose was enthusiastic about the new score when initially he saw the piano reduction made by Ingolf Dahl, but later was dismayed by the sound of the orchestra, and offended the composer by telegraphing the suggestion that Stravinsky should allow the scoring to be "retouched" by Robert Russell Bennett, who "orchestrates even the works of Cole Porter". Whole sections of the score had to be cut for the Philadelphia premiere, because the New York pit musicians, accustomed to the conventions of Broadway musicals of that period, were unable to manage the  bars that feature in Stravinsky's score.

A dozen years later, things were changing in musical theater in New York. Leonard Bernstein's Candide opened on Broadway in December 1956, and featured a variety of meters that Billy Rose's musicians would have found as impossible as Stravinsky's. Mary Rodgers's 1959 Once Upon a Mattress featured the  song "Sensitivity".

 Jazz 
In 1959, the Dave Brubeck Quartet released Time Out, a jazz album with music in unusual meters. It included Paul Desmond's "Take Five", in  time. Brubeck had studied with the French composer Darius Milhaud, who in turn had been strongly influenced by Stravinsky, and is credited with the systematic introduction of asymmetrical and shifting rhythms that sparked a far-reaching surge of interest in jazz and popular music in the 1960s.

Starting in 1964, the trumpeter and band leader Don Ellis sought to fuse traditional big-band styles with rhythms borrowed from Indian, Near Eastern music, and Balkan music. Two other Ellis compositions are entirely in  time: "Indian Lady" and "5/4 Getaway".

In 1966, the popular American television drama series Mission: Impossible began a seven-season run with the  "Theme from Mission: Impossible" by Lalo Schifrin, who also composed the  "Tar Sequence" for the motion picture (film) Cool Hand Luke.

In 1968, Leonard Feather interviewed pianist Johnny Guarnieri in DownBeat magazine; Guarnieri had spent the last few years working up arrangements of jazz standards changed to a  rhythm. Guarnieri stated "I can forsee 5/4, within the next few years, sweeping the world completely".

 Rock 
In the late 1960s, quintuple meters began to appear with some frequency in rock-music contexts as well, where exploration of meters other than  became one of the hallmarks of progressive rock. One of the earliest examples is "Grim Reaper of Love" by The Turtles (May 1966). Another early example is "Within You Without You" by George Harrison, recorded on The Beatles' Sgt. Pepper's Lonely Hearts Club Band LP of 1967. In the next two years,  meter occurred in another Beatles song by John Lennon and Paul McCartney: "Happiness Is a Warm Gun". (Isolated  bars also end phrases in "Across the Universe".) The Byrds' LP The Notorious Byrd Brothers (recorded in the second half of 1967, and released in January 1968) contained two songs using quintuple meter, "Get to You" and "Tribal Gathering".

Under the spell of Brubeck, Keith Emerson of Emerson, Lake & Palmer began exploring unusual meters at about this same time. His first quintuple-meter piece was "Azrael, the Angel of Death", written in 1968, and the meter cropped up again three years later in the opening instrumental section, "Eruption", of the title track and some later passages from the album Tarkus. Frank Zappa frequently played in 5; two specific documented examples are "Flower Punk" from 1968 (a repeating pattern of 4 bars of 5 followed by 4 bars of 7) and "Five Five Five" (bars of  combined with bars of ). Zappa even had a hand signal with which he could cue the band to quickly switch into a quintuple meter at any time during a live performance.

Other examples in popular music

 "Aliens", by Coldplay.
 "Bahlawan", by Mira Awad.Reply, Mira Awad's Facebook page, 22 March 2020. "the song is definitely in 5/8"
 "Bane's theme" (from The Dark Knight Rises), by Hans Zimmer.
 "Black Widow Spider" by Dr. John, from the 1969 album Babylon. Described as inspired by Dave Brubeck's "Take Five".
 "Caesar's Palace Blues" by the British progressive-rock group U.K., from their 1979 album Danger Money.
 "Closure", by Taylor Swift, from her 2020 album Evermore.
 "Countdown", by Dave Brubeck
 "Dance of the Little Fairies", by English group Sky.
 "Diagonals", by Stereolab.
 "Do What You Like", by Blind Faith.
 "Donkey Carol", a Christmas carol by John Rutter.
 "English Roundabout", by XTC.
"Face Dances, Pt. 2", by Pete Townshend.
 "15 Step", by Radiohead.
 "5/4" by Gorillaz.
 "5-4=Unity", by Pavement
"Morning Bell" by Radiohead. 
"Five", by Lamb.
 "From Eden", by Hozier.
"Halloween Theme (main title)" (from Halloween), by John Carpenter
 "Here Come The Bastards", by Primus.
 "Icon", by OHMME.
"In Her Eyes", by Josh Groban.
"The Incredits", main theme for The Incredibles.
 "Isengard Theme" (from The Lord of the Rings film trilogy), by Howard Shore.
 "Kamisama no Shitauchi", by Akeboshi.
 "Last Night", by Vanessa Hudgens
 "Living in the Past" by Jethro Tull.
 "The Man from U.N.C.L.E." (main theme) by Jerry Goldsmith.
 "River Man", by Nick Drake.
 "Seven Days" by Sting.
 "Soft Mistake", by Lamb.
 "Turn the World Around", by Harry Belafonte.
"Wind", by Akeboshi.
"WTF?", by OK Go.

Partially in quintuple time

 "Alphys" (from Undertale) by Toby Fox – last movement is in 
 "Animals" by Muse.
 "Cleopatra" by Weezer. Alternates  with 
 "Come On! Feel the Illinoise! (Part I: The World's Columbian Exposition – Part II: Carl Sandburg Visits Me in a Dream)" from Illinois (2005) by Sufjan Stevens ( and ).
"Down And Out" by Genesis.
 "ENDYMION" (from Dance Dance Revolution A) by fallen shepherd ft. RabbiTon Strings.
 "Erotomania" (part I of III of the suite called "A Mind Beside Itself") from Awake, by Dream Theater. Begins with  +  +  + , then  +  +  +  +  + , then  +  etc.
 "The Fixer" by Pearl Jam.
 "Four Sticks" by Led Zeppelin.
 "The Grudge" by Tool.
"Happy Jack" by the Who.
 "Innuendo" by Queen.
"Lorca" by Tim Buckley, from the 1970 album Lorca.
 "Moon" by Björk ( and ).
 "Mother" (from The Wall) and "Two Suns in the Sunset" (from The Final Cut), both by Pink Floyd.
 "Neon Pattern Drum" by Jon Hopkins has " and  time signatures operat[ing] simultaneously".
 "953" by Black Midi
 "The Number of the Beast" by Iron Maiden
 "Overground" by Siouxsie and the Banshees.
 "Pray You Catch Me" by Beyoncé, James Blake, and Kevin Garrett, alternating  + .
 "Question!" by System of a Down.
 "Red" by King Crimson, from the album Red.
"The River" by King Gizzard & the Lizard Wizard is in  until the final verse, which switches to  through the outro.
 "Rosetta Stoned" by Tool.
 "Kid Gloves" by Rush.
 "Streamline" by System of a Down, the majority of the chorus is in  while the rest of the song is written in 
"White Room" by Cream.
 "YYZ" by Rush opens in  using a musical interpretation of the Toronto Pearson International Airport IATA identifier code using Morse code.

Notes

Sources

 
 
 
 
 
 
 
 
 
 
 

 
 
 
 
 
 
 
 
 
 
 
 
 
 
 
 
 
 
 
 
 
 
 
 
 
 
 
 
 
 
 
 
 
 
 

 
 
 
 
 
 
 
 
 
 
 
 
 .
 
 
 
 

 
 
 
 
 
 
 
 
 
 
 
 
 
 
 
 
 
 
 
 
 
 
 
 
 
 
 
 
 
 
 
 
 
 

 
 
 
 

 
 
 
 
 
 
 
 
 
 
 
 
 
 
 
 
 
 
 
 
 
 
 
 
 
 
 
 
 
 
 
 
 
 
 
 
 
 
 
 
 
 
 
 

 
 
 .
 
 
 
 
 
 
 

 
 

 
 
 

 
 

Further reading
 Arlin, Mary I. 2000. "Metric Mutation and Modulation: The Nineteenth-Century Speculations of F.-J. Fétis". Journal of Music Theory 44, no. 2 (Autumn): 261–322.
 Barber, Samuel. 1943. String Quartet, Op. 11. G. Schirmer's Edition of Study Scores of Orchestral Works and Chamber Music 28. New York: G. Schirmer.
 Bartók, Béla. 1942. Sonata for Two Pianos and Percussion. London: Hawkes & Son (Ltd.).
 Britten, Benjamin. 1946. Quartet No. 2 in C, Op. 36. London: Boosey & Hawkes.
 Buchanan, Donna A. 2001. "Bulgaria: II. Traditional Music". The New Grove Dictionary of Music and Musicians, second edition, edited by Stanley Sadie and John Tyrrell. London: Macmillan Publishers.
Cronshaw, Andrew. 1990. "Trikitixa!". Folk Roots 11, no. 10:82 (April): 28–29, 31.
 Flashkirby. 2015. "Wild Woods (Mario Kart 8 Transcription)", uploaded 10 May. Musescore.com (accessed 5 April 2019).
Frampton, John Ross. 1926. "Some Evidence for the Naturalness of the Less Usual Rhythms". The Musical Quarterly 12, no. 3 (July): 400–405.
Howes, Frank. 1945. "Anthropology and Music". Man 45 (September–October): 107–108.
Laborde, Denis. 2001. "Basque Music". The New Grove Dictionary of Music and Musicians, second edition, edited by Stanley Sadie and John Tyrrell. London: Macmillan Publishers.
 Mathis-Lilley, Ben. 2006. "Secrets of the Radiohead Set List". New York 39, no. 23 (26 June): 88–89 (accessed 23 March 2008).
Nettl, Bruno. 1953. "Stylistic Variety in North American Indian Music". Journal of the American Musicological Society 6, no. 2 (Summer): 160–168.
Nettl, Bruno. 1965. "The Songs of Ishi: Musical Style of the Yahi Indians". The Musical Quarterly 51, no. 3 (July): 460–477.
Miner, Ansorena, and José Ignacio. 1993. "El zortziko: La frase de ocho compases y el compás de cinco por ocho". Txistulari, no. 155 (July–September).
Sánchez Ekiza, Carlos. 1991a. "En torno al zortziko". Txistulari, no. 146 (July): 44–53.
Sánchez Ekiza, Carlos. 1991b. "En torno al zortziko". Cuadernos de etnología y etnografía de Navarra'' 23, no. 57 (January–June): 89–103.

Australian Aboriginal music
Asian rhythm
European rhythm
Time signatures
Articles containing video clips